Thamshavn or Thamshamn is a small port village in the municipality of Orkland in Trøndelag county, Norway. It is the site of the port for the town of Orkanger and the ferrosilicon plant Elkem Thamshavn. It is located right along European route E39 and is the Thamshavn Station was the terminus of the Thamshavnbanen railway.

History
Thamshavn came into being in 1867 when the local farmer Wilhelm Thams established a sawmill on the area that was named after him. He and his son Christian Thams bought the Løkken Mine at Løkken Verk in 1904 and decided to build a railway from the mine to Thamshavn where they could ship out the pyrites to continental Europe. At the same time the steam ship D/S Orkla started operating between Thamshavn and Trondheim.

In 1931, Orkla Metall (now Elkem Thamshavn) was established by the Orkla Mining Company to smelt the pyrites to sulfur and copper. During World War II, Thamshavn was one of the targets for the Thamshavnbanen sabotage. Today the mine is abandoned and the railway has been converted to a heritage railway, but the smelter and port still live on.

Today
Thamshavn still has a working smelting plant that is owned by Elkem. The smelting plant employs about 130 people on a daily basis, producing some of the finest silicon there is in the world. Elkem Thamshavn is also famous for its energy renewal program—one of the first of its kind in the world to use this technology. Today, Elkem Thamshavn reuses 20-25% of all energy used.

References

Villages in Trøndelag
Orkland
Orkla ASA